The Actors Studio is a membership organization for professional actors, theatre directors and playwrights at 432 West 44th Street between Ninth and Tenth avenues in the Hell's Kitchen neighborhood of Manhattan in New York City. It was founded on October 5, 1947, by Elia Kazan, Cheryl Crawford, and Robert Lewis, who provided training for actors who were members. Lee Strasberg joined later and took the helm in 1951 until his death on February 17, 1982.

The Studio is best known for its work refining and teaching method acting. The approach was originally developed by the Group Theatre in the 1930s based on the innovations of Konstantin Stanislavski. While at the Studio, actors work together to develop their skills in a private environment where they can take risks as performers without the pressure of commercial roles.

, the studio's co-presidents are Ellen Burstyn, Alec Baldwin and Al Pacino. The artistic director in New York is Beau Gravitte, and the Associate Artistic Director in New York is Estelle Parsons.

History
After an initial meeting held on October 5, 1947, at the Labor Stage, located at 106 W. 39th Street (formerly the Princess Theatre), in which goals and ground rules of the new organization were discussed, the studio officially opened for business the following day at the Union Methodist Episcopal Church, located at 229 West 48th Street, previously home to the Actors Kitchen and Lounge (maintained to assist actors and others unable to afford meals), and long a source of rental rehearsal space for local theatrical producers.

Before settling in its current location in 1955, the Studio moved regularly over an eight-year period: In January 1948, it was a dance studio on East 59th Street. In April of that year, a move to the CBS Building at 1697 Broadway, near 53rd Street, established some semblance of stability; the Studio would not move again until the summer of 1952. From that point, the old Theatre Guild rehearsal rooms on the top floor of the ANTA Theatre became home, as they would remain until October 1954, when theatre renovations reduced the Studio to renting space twice a week. This it did at the Malin Studios at 1545 Broadway, room 610. This arrangement continued throughout the 1954–1955 theatrical season, even as the Studio was acquiring and renovating its current venue.

In 1955, it moved to its current location in the former West 44th Street United Presbyterian Church, a Greek Revival structure which was built for the Seventh Associate Presbyterian Church in 1858 or 1859. It was one of the last churches to be built in that style in New York City.

Graduate drama school
From September 1994 through May 2005, the Studio collaborated with The New School in the education of master's-level theatre students at the Actors Studio Drama School (ASDS). After ending its contract with The New School, the Actors Studio established The Actors Studio Drama School at Pace University in 2006.

See also
Inside the Actors Studio

References
Notes

Further reading
Articles
 Gerard, Jeremy (April 8, 1988) "Frank Corsaro to Head Actors Studio," The New York Times 
 Heimer, Mel (October 19, 1965), "My New York" Rochester Sentinel p. 2 
 Kleiner, Dick (December 21, 1956) "The Actors Studio: Making Stars Out of the Unknown," Sarasota Journal p. 26
 Pogrebin, Robin (June 20, 2000) "Pacino, Burstyn and Keitel To Lead the Actors Studio," The New York Times
 Seligsohn, Leo (January 6, 1974) "Actors Studio Needs Cash Birthday Gift," Sarasota Herald-Tribune p. 6-B
 Smith, Liz (May 30, 1983) "Controversy Engulfs Actors Studio As Anna Strasberg Resigns," Sarasota Herald-Tribune p. 4-C

Books
 Frome, Shelly (2001) The Actors Studio: a History. Jefferson, North Carolina: McFarland. 
 Garfield, David (1980) A Player's Place: The Story of the Actors Studio. New York: MacMillan. 
 Hirsch, Foster (1984) A Method to their Madness: The History of the Actors Studio. New York: WW Norton & Co Inc.

External links

 
 PBS American Masters Series profile
 Inside the Actors Studio
 The Actors Studio Drama School at Pace University
 Audio collection of the Actors Studio from 1956–69 at the Wisconsin Historical Society
 A brief history of the Actors Studio, including Lee Strasberg on its origin and purpose.
 David Garfield research files on the Actors Studio, 1947–2003 (bulk 1970–1982), held by the Billy Rose Theatre Division, New York Public Library for the Performing Arts

 
Drama schools in the United States
Actors Studio alumni
Organizations based in New York City
Education in Manhattan
Pace University
1947 establishments in New York City
Theatre in New York City